Grinna Lighthouse is a coastal lighthouse in the municipality of Nærøysund in Trøndelag, Norway. It was established in 1904 and automated in 1987. Grinna lighthouse stands on the islet of Grinna in the South Gjæslingan island group on the north side of the Foldafjord.

See also

Lighthouses in Norway
List of lighthouses in Norway

References

External links
 Norsk Fyrhistorisk Forening 
 Picture of Grinna Lighthouse

Lighthouses completed in 1904
Lighthouses in Trøndelag
Nærøysund
Vikna